Sibley Township is a township in Cloud County, Kansas, USA.  As of the 2000 census, its population was 178.

Geography
According to the USGS, it contains three cemeteries: Gottland, Saron and Sibley.

The streams of Buffalo Creek, Grave Creek, Hay Creek and Lost Creek run through this township.

References
 USGS Geographic Names Information System (GNIS)

External links
 US-Counties.com
 City-Data.com

Townships in Cloud County, Kansas
Townships in Kansas